Some online news media have created Application Programming Interfaces (APIs) to enable computer applications to request stories and information about their stories (metadata) from them.

List of 1st-party news APIs

References 

Journalism lists
Application programming interfaces
Electronic publishing